Joseph or Joe Ford may refer to:

Joseph Dillon Ford (born 1952), American composer and author
Joe Ford (musician) (born 1947), American jazz saxophonist
Joe Ford (footballer) (1886–?), English footballer
Joe Ford (rugby union) (born 1990), rugby union footballer
Joseph M. Ford (1912–1954), member of the Dearborn, MI City Council 1945–1953
Joe T. Ford, CEO and co-founder of Alltel
Joseph Ford (physicist) (1927–1995), physics professor and author at Georgia Tech